The men's long jump at the 2014 IPC Athletics European Championships was held at the Swansea University Stadium from 18–23 August.

Medalists

Results

T11

T12

T13

T20

T36

T37

T38

T42/44

T47

See also
List of IPC world records in athletics

References

long jump
Long jump at the World Para Athletics European Championships